Baskouré is a department of Kouritenga Province in eastern Burkina Faso. Its capital lies at the town of Baskouré. According to the 2006 census the department has a total population of 11,723.

Towns and villages
 Baskouré (2,703 inhabitants) (capital)
 Balgo (165 inhabitants)
 Boumdoudoum (413 inhabitants)
 Komsilga (784 inhabitants)
 Lilgomde (248 inhabitants)
 Nakaba (2,934 inhabitants)
 Niago (365 inhabitants)
 Oualogo (727 inhabitants)
 Ounougou (969 inhabitants)
 Sambraoghin (1,124 inhabitants)
 Seguem (340 inhabitants)
 Tossin (951 inhabitants)

Demographics

References

Departments of Burkina Faso
Kouritenga Province